Season 1 of Fast N' Loud started on June 6, 2012, and ended on December 8, 2012, for a total of 14 episodes. Season 1 was filmed on location on Reeder Road in Dallas, Texas, in a shop building rented from Phipps Auto, which was also featured in the show. The Gas Monkey Garage crew worked in the back shop, while Rawlings brought Corvettes, Cadillacs, and other cars that were going to be "quick flips" to Dewaine Phipps to get them running again. Gas Monkey Garage also had an ongoing business relationship with Sue Martin, a successful Taiwanese immigrant, at ASM Auto Upholstery, a business that was literally within car-pushing distance of their shop. KC Mathieu, a long-time friend of Kaufman's and owner of KC's Paint Shop, is part of the regular GMG crew and the painter for Gas Monkey Garage. Another heavily featured member of the Gas Monkey Garage crew during Season 1 was Scot McMillan Jr., of Scot Rods Garage, who left at the end of Season 1 to work at his own shop. During Season 1, Rawlings also hired an office assistant named Christie Brimberry, who makes repeated appearances on the show. The final two episodes of the season are not available for streaming on Discovery+.

Episodes

References 

2012 American television seasons